James Steen may refer to:

Jim Steen (American football) (1913–1983), American football player
James Steen (planter) (1734–1780), American planter
James Steen (water polo) (1876–1949), American water polo player
James Steen (politician) (died 1862), reeve of Fitzroy township, Ontario
Jim Steen, swimming coach
James Steen (journalist), journalist and author